Martha Hooper Blackler Kalopothakes (Blackler; June 1, 1830 – December 16, 1871) was a 19th-century American missionary to Greece. She was also a journalist and translator. Kalopothakes died in 1871.

Biography
Martha Hooper Blackler was born in Marblehead, Massachusetts, June 1, 1830. She was the daughter of Captain Francis Blackler. Having been converted early in life, she felt a deep interest in the cause of missions.

In 1858, she married Rev. Michael Demetrius Kalopothakes (Μιχαήλ Δ. Καλοποθάκης; 1825–1911), M.D. of Athens, who had spent several years in the United States studying medicine and theology. After graduating as a Calvinist and Reformed theologian from the Union Theological Seminary, New York City, he returned, accompanied by his wife, as a Protestant missionary to his native land. They had at least one child, a son, Francis Demetrius Kalopothakes (b. 1867).

Kalopothakes became so proficient in the Greek language that she was able to correct the proof-sheets of the Star of the East, a weekly paper published by her husband who was the founder of the Greek Protestant church. She translated books from the English and wrote articles for the Child's Paper, published also in Greek, and aided him in his correspondence with friends in England and the U.S. Though naturally somewhat timid, her gentle disposition and devotion to her work drew the people to her, and her influence was widely felt among the Greek women. But her excessive labors affected her health so seriously that it became necessary for her to return with her husband and children to the U.S. for a brief respite. In August. 1871, she sailed again for her missionary field, but died in Athens, December 16, 1871, after a few months of labor.

References

Attribution

Sources
 

1830 births
1871 deaths
19th-century American non-fiction writers
19th-century American women writers
19th-century American newspaper editors
American Protestant missionaries
Female Christian missionaries
Protestant missionaries in Greece
Translators from English
People from Marblehead, Massachusetts
Calvinist and Reformed writers
19th-century Calvinist and Reformed Christians
Women newspaper editors
19th-century American translators
Missionary linguists